Karol Angielski (born 20 March 1996) is a Polish professional footballer who plays as a striker for Sivasspor.

Career statistics

Club

Honours
Radomiak Radom
I liga: 2020–21

References

1996 births
Sportspeople from Kielce
Living people
Polish footballers
Poland youth international footballers
Association football forwards
Korona Kielce players
Śląsk Wrocław players
Piast Gliwice players
Zawisza Bydgoszcz players
Olimpia Grudziądz players
Wisła Płock players
Radomiak Radom players
Sivasspor footballers
Ekstraklasa players
I liga players
III liga players
Süper Lig players
Polish expatriate footballers
Expatriate footballers in Turkey
Polish expatriate sportspeople in Turkey